Nannoleon is a genus of antlions in the insect family Myrmeleontidae in the order Neuroptera. It comprises a single species, Nannoleon michaelseni, which is found in Namibia and South Africa.

References

External links

Myrmeleontidae genera
Monotypic Neuroptera genera
Myrmeleontidae